Asplenium adiantum-nigrum is a common species of fern known by the common name black spleenwort. It is found mostly in Africa, Europe, and Eurasia, but is also native to a few locales in Mexico and the United States.

Description
This spleenwort has thick, triangular leaf blades up to 10 centimeters long which are divided into several subdivided segments. It is borne on a reddish green petiole and the rachis is shiny and slightly hairy. The undersides of each leaf segment have one or more sori arranged in chains.

Taxonomy
Linnaeus was the first to describe black spleenwort with the binomial Asplenium adiantum-nigrum in his Species Plantarum of 1753.

A chloroplast phylogeny verified the allopolyploid origin of A. adiantum-nigrum, with A. cuneifolium supplying the paternal genome and A. onopteris the maternal genome.

Native distribution
Asplenium adiantum-nigrum is native to:
Africa
Northern and Southern Africa in: -  Algeria; Lesotho; Morocco; the provinces of South Africa including Eastern Cape, Free State, Gauteng, KwaZulu-Natal, Limpopo, Mpumalanga, Northern Cape, and Western Cape; and Tunisia.
Asia
Western Asia and Central Asia in - the Caucasus; Azerbaijan; Cyprus; the Sinai Peninsula of Egypt; Kyrgyzstan; Ciscaucasia and Dagestan in Russia; and Turkey.
Europe
Albania; Austria; Belgium; Bulgaria; the Czech Republic; Denmark; Finland; France (including Corsica); Germany; Greece; Hungary; Ireland; Italy (including Sardinia); the Netherlands; Norway; Poland; Portugal, Romania; Spain; Sweden; Switzerland; Ukraine (including Krym); the United Kingdom; and in the Balkan Peninsula (former Yugoslavia)
Macaronesia
Macaronesian archipelagoes of: the Azores, Madeira, the Canary Islands.
North America
Southwestern United States - Arizona, Colorado, and Utah
Oceania
Hawaii
In Hawaii, this native fern grows on cinder cones and lava flows, and it is present in Hawaii Volcanoes National Park.

References

External links

 USDA Plants Profile - Asplenium adiantum-nigrum

adiantum-nigrum
Flora of Northeastern Mexico
Flora of the Southwestern United States
Native ferns of Hawaii
Plants described in 1753
Ferns of Asia
Ferns of Africa
Ferns of Europe
Taxa named by Carl Linnaeus